EUobserver is a European online newspaper, launched in 2000 by the Brussels-based organisation EUobserver.com ASBL. 

The newspaper provides both daily reports and in-depth coverage on international affairs related to the European Union (EU). It is regarded as one of the first English language media outlets dedicated to the reporting of EU affairs, since joined by The Brussels Times, EURACTIV and Politico Europe.

Organisation

The website was first launched in 2000 by Lisbeth Kirk, a Danish journalist.

There is much academic debate over whether EUobserver, along with other similar publications, can be considered to be contributing to the creation of a pan-European public sphere.

Kirk served as both editor-in-chief and business chief of the paper until 2015, after which she was replaced by Eric Maurice, who took over as editor-in-chief of the publication. In 2019, Koert Debeuf was appointed as new editor-in-chief of EUobserver.
The British American journalist James Kanter took over as editor-in-chief from February 2022 until March 2022. At the same time, the Brussels-based commentator Shada Islam joined EUobserver as editor of the EUobserver magazine.

Readership
The newspaper claims both financial independence from EU institutions and a daily circulation of 60,000.

In a 2008 poll of 100 Brussels-based journalists by APCO, one third claimed to use the publication as their source for EU news, making it, at the time, the "second most influential" media outlet reporting on EU affairs behind the Financial Times. Also, in a 2016 media survey, conducted by ComRes and Burson-Marsteller on ‘What Influences the Influencers’, it was found that EUobserver tended to be the preferred source of news for EU officials.

Since EUobserver is an online medium, with the exception of its quarterly magazine editions, it relies on a growing social media following on Twitter, Facebook and LinkedIn, reaching 330,000 followers in 2019.

See also
E!Sharp
EURACTIV
Euronews
EU Scream
Politico Europe
The Brussels Times
Voxeurop

References

External links
 

Mass media in the European Union
Newspapers published in Brussels
2000 establishments in Belgium
Newspapers established in 2000
Belgian news websites